Papaipema inquaesita, the sensitive fern borer, is a species of cutworm or dart moth in the family Noctuidae. It is found in North America.

The MONA or Hodges number for Papaipema inquaesita is 9483.

References

Further reading

 

Papaipema
Moths described in 1868